Uttama Savanayana (born 19 May 1960) is a Thai politician. He served as Minister of Finance in the second cabinet of Prime Minister Prayut Chan-o-cha. He resigned in July 2020. On 19 January 2022, Savanayana formed a new party called Sang Anakot Thai (Building Thailand's Future) along with Sontirat Sontijirawong.

Early life and education 
Uttam Saanayana was born on 19 May 1960 to be the son of Lek and Ya Yee Savanayana. He graduated from primary and secondary school from Chulalongkorn University Demonstration School and bachelor's degree in electrical engineering From Brown University, USA. Then he studies Master of Business Administration (Finance and International Business) at Kellogg School of Management, Northwestern University and Ph.D. in Financial Management, Isenberg School of Management, University of Massachusetts Amherst.

Careers 
Uttama is a private financial institution manager. He worked as a teacher in a higher education institution and become Deputy Dean of Academic Department and Lecturer in the Faculty of Finance, National Institute of Development Administration and was appointed rector of Bangkok University in June 2015. He was an advisor to the Minister of Finance, Somkid Jatusripitak and Assistant Minister to the Prime Minister's Office. Later in 2015, he was appointed Minister of Information and Communication Technology in the government of Prayut Chan-o-cha but submitted a resignation letter on 12 September 2016 to have the appointment of the Digital Economy and Society Minister, a ministry to be established. He was appointed as an advisor to the Prime Minister on 15 September 2016. In December 2016, he was appointed Minister of Industry and Minister of Finance respectively.

Royal decorations 
 2017 -  Knight Grand Cordon (Special Class) of the Most Exalted Order of the White Elephant
 2020 -  Knight Grand Cordon (Special Class) of The Most Noble Order of the Crown of Thailand

References 

Living people
1960 births
Uttama Savanayana
Uttama Savanayana
Uttama Savanayana
Uttama Savanayana
Uttama Savanayana
Uttama Savanayana
Brown University alumni
Isenberg School of Management alumni
Uttama Savanayana
Uttama Savanayana